George William Chase (1810April 17, 1867) was a U.S. Representative from New York.

Born in the town of Maryland, New York, Chase attended the common schools.  He became a farmer, miller, leather manufacturer, and merchant in Schenevus, New York.  He was also active in other business ventures, including serving on the board of directors of the Albany and Susquehanna Railroad.  From 1842 to 1843 he served as Maryland's Town Supervisor. In addition, at different times he also served as postmaster of both Maryland and Schenevus.

Chase was elected as a Whig to the Thirty-third Congress (March 4, 1853 – March 3, 1855).  After leaving Congress he resumed his former agricultural and business pursuits, including serving on the board of directors of the Second National Bank of Cooperstown.

He died in Chaseville, Maryland Township, New York on April 17, 1867, and was interred in the Chase vault in Schenevus Cemetery.

References

1810 births
1867 deaths
New York (state) postmasters
Town supervisors in New York (state)
Whig Party members of the United States House of Representatives from New York (state)
19th-century American politicians
Burials in New York (state)